The Oil City Area School District is a midsized, rural public school district in Venango County, Pennsylvania, centered on the city of Oil City. Other communities that it serves include: the borough of Rouseville, and townships of Oakland, and Cornplanter. A portion of President Township is also within the district's boundaries. According to 2000 federal census data, the district serves a resident population of 16,270. In 2009, the district residents' per capita income was $15,503, while the median family income was $38,401. In the Commonwealth, the median family income was $49,501  and the United States median family income was $49,445, in 2010. In 2006, the 2,122 student population was 96% white, 3% black, < 0.5% Asian, Native American < 0.5% and 1% Hispanic.

The district operates three elementary schools---Hasson Heights, Seventh Street, and Smedley Street, plus one middle school and one high school.

Extracurriculars
The district offers a wide variety of clubs, activities and sports. These programs begin with elementary children and extend through high school athletics. Eligibility to participate in these activities is determined by school board policy.

By Pennsylvania law, all K-12 students in the district, including those who attend a private nonpublic school, cyber charter school, charter school and those home schooled, are eligible to participate in the extracurricular programs, including all athletics. They must meet the same eligibility rules as the students enrolled in the district's schools.

References

School districts in Venango County, Pennsylvania